Deborah Knight (born 23 November 1972) is an Australian television and news presenter, radio host, and journalist.

Knight is currently a radio presenter on 2GB and host of A Current Affair on Friday and Saturday. Previously she has been a co-host of the Nine Network's breakfast program Today and presented Nine News Sydney on Friday and Saturday.

Career

Knight studied at Charles Sturt University in Bathurst, New South Wales, where she earned a degree in journalism, graduating in 1993.

She began her career in the media working for the radio station 2WG in Wagga Wagga and then moved to Mix 106.5 in Sydney before accepting a position with the Australian Broadcasting Corporation.

Network 10 
Later on, she moved to Network 10 and in 2001 was appointed the US correspondent on 10 News First, during which she covered major world events such as the September 11 attacks. Upon her return to Australia, she became co-host of the flagship Sydney bulletin in January 2006, replacing Jessica Rowe, and a regular substitute presenter on the network's national late-night news bulletin.

In October 2011, Knight was replaced by Sandra Sully as the presenter of Network Ten's Ten News at Five in Sydney.

Nine Network 
In December 2011, Knight joined the Nine Network, replacing Alicia Gorey as news presenter on Weekend Today and Monday news presenter on Today.

In February 2015, Knight was appointed co-host of Weekend Today, replacing Leila McKinnon.

In December 2017, Knight was appointed as presenter of Nine News Sydney on Friday and Saturday nights, replacing Georgie Gardner who replaced Lisa Wilkinson on Today. It was also announced that Allison Langdon would replace Knight on Weekend Today.

Knight has been a fill in presenter on Today, Today Extra, A Current Affair and Nine News Sydney.

In January 2019, Knight was confirmed as the new co-host of the Nine Network's breakfast program Today, replacing Karl Stefanovic.

In November 2019, the Nine Network announced that Knight will be replaced as co-host of Today with Karl Stefanovic returning to the show as co-host alongside Weekend Today co-host and 60 Minutes reporter Allison Langdon from January 2020.

In December 2019, it was announced that Knight will replace Steve Price to host Afternoons on 2GB from 13 January 2020.

Personal life
Knight is married and has three children.

References

 

Nine News presenters
10 News First presenters
Living people
1972 births
Charles Sturt University alumni
People from Coffs Harbour
Australian television talk show hosts
Australian women television presenters
Australian women radio presenters
2GB presenters